The Bäderhorn (2,009 m) is a mountain of the Bernese Alps, located north of the Jaun Pass in the canton of Bern. It lies on the range between the valleys of Jaun and Simmental.

References

External links
Bäderhorn on Hikr.org

Mountains of the Alps
Mountains of the canton of Bern
Two-thousanders of Switzerland
Mountains of Switzerland